Dinoderus is a genus of bamboo powderpost beetles in the family Bostrichidae. There are more than 20 described species in Dinoderus.

Description 
In adults of Dinoderus, the pronotum is hood-like and conceals the head from above (a feature shared with other Dinoderinae). The body ranges from 2.2 to 4.5 mm in length. The pronotum has posterolateral carina, though these are weakly developed in some species. The elytra are never more than twice as long as the pronotum. The second segment of the antenna is less than half as long as the first segment.

Pests 
Some species in this genus, namely D. japonicus, D. minutus, D. ocellaris and D. brevis are major pests of bamboo, attacking both harvested culms and finished products. Adults enter culms via wounds or cut ends, make horizontal tunnels and deposit eggs. These hatch into larvae, which bore longitudinally in culms, making criss-crossing tunnels.

They also attack wood and stored foods, such as yam chips and cassava chips.

Species
These 28 species belong to the genus Dinoderus:

 Dinoderus bifoveolatus (Wollaston, 1858)
 Dinoderus borneanus Lesne, 1933
 Dinoderus brevis Horn, 1878
 Dinoderus creberrimus Lesne, 1941
 Dinoderus cuneicollis Wickham, 1913
 Dinoderus distinctus Lesne, 1897
 Dinoderus exilis Lesne, 1932
 Dinoderus favosus Lesne, 1911
 Dinoderus gabonicus Lesne, 1921
 Dinoderus gardneri Lesne, 1933
 Dinoderus glabripennis Lesne, 1911
 Dinoderus japonicus Lesne, 1895 (Japanese shot-hole borer)
 Dinoderus koi Borowski & Wegrzynowicz, 2013
 Dinoderus mangiferae Lesne, 1921
 Dinoderus minutus (Fabricius, 1775) (bamboo powderpost beetle)
 Dinoderus nitidus Lesne, 1897
 Dinoderus oblongopunctatus Lesne, 1923
 Dinoderus ocellaris Stephens, 1830
 Dinoderus ochraceipennis Lesne, 1906
 Dinoderus papuanus Lesne, 1899
 Dinoderus perfoliatus Gorham, 1886
 Dinoderus perplexus Lesne, 1932
 Dinoderus piceolus Lesne, 1933
 Dinoderus politulus Lesne, 1941
 Dinoderus porcellus Lesne, 1923
 Dinoderus punctatissimus Lesne, 1897
 Dinoderus scabricauda Lesne, 1914
 Dinoderus speculifer Lesne, 1895

References

Further reading

External links

 

Bostrichidae
Articles created by Qbugbot
Bostrichoidea genera